One Mile from Heaven is a 1937 American drama film directed by Allan Dwan and written by Lou Breslow and John Patrick. The film stars Claire Trevor, Sally Blane, Douglas Fowley, Fredi Washington, Joan Carroll and Ralf Harolde. The film was released on August 18, 1937, by 20th Century Fox.

Plot
While investigating a bogus murder story in a black neighborhood, a reporter, Lucy "Tex" Warren (Claire Trevor) notices a little girl named Sunny who appears to be white.  Tex also encounters Sunny's mother, Flora Jackson (Fredi Washington), a black seamstress.  Suspicious of the claim, Tex and other reporters investigate, only to turn up evidence (photos and a hospital record) that support Flora's claim. Tex then encounters a prison convict who claims that Sunny is the child of a deceased criminal Cliff Lucas, who took the baby from his wife, Barbara (Sally Blane) when she attempted to leave him and then hired Flora to take care of the child.  After Lucas was killed by police, Flora did not want the baby to go to an orphanage, so she reared Sunny as her own.  Barbara, on being informed that her daughter is still alive (Cliff Lucas had told her that the baby had drowned), applies to recover her child and, after seeing Flora's strong attachment to Sunny, asks Flora to live with them as a nurse.  Meanwhile, the judge forbids Tex to publish the story, feeling that the notoriety would negatively affect Sunny.

According to the Museum of Modern Art in 2013, One Mile from Heaven was "the last of the six Claire Trevor 'snappy' vehicles [Allan] Dwan made for Fox in the 1930s tests the limits of free expression on race in Hollywood while sometimes straining credulity."

Cast   
Claire Trevor as Lucy 'Tex' Warren
Sally Blane as Barbara Harrison
Douglas Fowley as Jim Tabor
Fredi Washington as Flora Jackson
Joan Carroll as Sunny
Ralf Harolde as Moxie McGrath
John Eldredge as Jerry Harrison
Paul McVey as Johnny
Ray Walker as Mortimer (Buck) Atlas
Russell Hopton as Peter Brindell
Chick Chandler as Charlie Milford
Eddie "Rochester" Anderson as Henry Bangs
Howard Hickman as Judge Clarke
Bill Robinson as Officer Joe Dudley

References

External links 
 

1937 films
20th Century Fox films
American drama films
1937 drama films
Films directed by Allan Dwan
American black-and-white films
1930s English-language films
1930s American films